Rineloricaria stellata is a species of catfish in the family Loricariidae. It is native to South America, where it occurs in the Uruguay River basin in Brazil, including the Buricá River, the Ibicuí River, the Ijuí River, and the Piratini River. The species reaches 11 cm (4.3 inches) in standard length and is believed to be a facultative air-breather.

References 

Loricariini
Catfish of South America
Fish described in 2008
Freshwater fish of Brazil